Sabia may refer to:

People
 Donato Sabia (1963–2020), runner
 Eli Sabia (born 1988), footballer
 Laura Sabia (1916–1996), social activist
 Michael Sabia (born 1953), executive
 Joe Sabia, digital remix artist
 Vilmar da Cunha Rodrigues (born 1982), also known as Sabia, Brazilian footballer

Music
 "Sabiá" (song), also known as "The Song of the Sabiá", a song by Antônio Carlos Jobim and Chico Buarque

Science
 Sabia (gastropod), a genus of hoof snails
 Sabia (plant), a genus of flowering plant
 Mimosa caesalpiniaefolia, also known as Sabiá, a tree from Brazil
 Sabiá virus, the cause of Brazilian hemorrhagic fever